Aegrotocatellus is a genus of trilobite in the order Phacopida, which existed in what is now Nunavut, Canada. It was named by Adrain and Edgecombe in 1995, and the type species is Aegrotocatellus jaggeri, a species named after British musician Mick Jagger.

See also
Anomphalus jaggerius  – snail named after Mick Jagger
Jaggermeryx naida, extinct species of semiaquatic anthracothere named after Jagger
Perirehaedulus richardsi a species of prehistoric trilobite named after British musician Keith Richards
List of organisms named after famous people (born 1900–1949)

References

External links
 Aegrotocatellus at the Paleobiology Database

Encrinuridae genera
Mick Jagger
Fossils of Canada
Paleontology in Nunavut
Fossil taxa described in 1995